The Maldives national basketball team represents Maldives in international basketball competitions and is controlled by Maldives Basketball Association.

Current squad
2019 South Asian Games Squad

Competitions

Performance at Summer Olympics
yet to qualify

Performance at World championships
yet to qualify

FIBA Asia Cup

References

External links
 Official website

Basketball teams in the Maldives
Men's national basketball teams
National sports teams of the Maldives
1997 establishments in the Maldives